The Mond Cup is a cup competition in Welsh football organised by the West Wales Football Association.

History
The competition was established in 1923 and is considered to be one of the oldest domestic cup competition for Welsh football clubs, after the more well known and prestigious Welsh Cup. Unlike the Welsh Cup, where 135 teams entered in 2008–09, the competition is only open to the members of the West Wales Football Association. It was named after Sir Alfred Mond who is believed to have funded the establishment of the competition.

Format
The format has changes many times over the years. From XXXX to 2008–09 the cup was a straight knockout competition. From 2009–10 to 2012–13 the competition consisted of four groups with the winners then making the semi-finals. All ties were then played at Richmond Park, the home ground of Carmarthen Town.

Winners
The first Mond Cup was won by ???

Past Cup Winners
Season-by-season list of winners and runners-up.

See also
Football in Wales
Welsh football league system
Welsh Cup
FAW Premier Cup
List of football clubs in Wales
List of stadiums in Wales by capacity

References

External links

2
 
Wales
Cymru Premier
Recurring sporting events established in 1923
1923 establishments in Wales